Moodabidri Mūḍubidire;  also called Mudbidri, Moodbidre and Bedra), is a town and taluk in Dakshina Kannada district. It lies 34 km northeast of the  district headquarters, Mangalore, in Karnataka, India.

Because of widely grown bamboo in ancient days, this place was named as Moodabidri. Moodabidri comes from two Tulu words, mūḍu "east" and bidiru "bamboo".

Demographics

 India census, Moodabidri had a population of 25,710. Males constitute 48% of the population and females 52%. Moodabidri has an average literacy rate of 88.57%, Male literacy is 93.13%, and female literacy is 84.13%.

Moodabidri basically contains two villages: Pranthya and Marnad. Moodabidri is also called as "Jaina Kashi of the South".

Location 
Moodabidri is on National Highway 169 (old NH 13). It is accessible from Mangalore city (34 km away) by road. Mangalore International Airport is 23 km away from Moodabidri.

It is 54 km from Udupi and 18 km from Karkala. Other nearby places are Venur (20 km), Belthangady (37 km), Kudremukh (66 km), Agumbe (68 km), Puttur (54 km) Siddakatte (12 km) and Mijar (5 km)

Religion and culture 

Jainism was and still is strongly practised in Moodabidri. The Thousand Pillars Temple (Saavira Kambada Basadi) is a holy shrine for Jains across the country. It also has Guru Basadi which houses the treasured Dhavala text. There are other Basadis: Ammanvara Basadi and Leppada Basadi. There are several Jain temples in Moodbidri.

There are a number of Hindu temples in Moodbidri as well. Hanuman temple of Moodbidri is one of the area's Hanuman temples . Here the devotees offer tender coconut as offering to the God. On Saturdays an average of about four to five thousand tender coconuts are offered to Lord Hanuman.

Shri Venkataramana temple is a rock built temple and is known for the celebration of Karthika Deepotsava, holy Keredeepotsava, Sharada Mahotsava, and other functions. There are carved Dashavatar statues in the other veranda.

A sizable number practice Roman Catholicism in Moodbidri. There are around 14 churches in and around Moodbidri Varado. Among them, is the 16th century old Portuguese-built church Igreja da Santa Cruz Hospet or Hospet Church.

Tradition and festivals

Hulivesha 
Hulivesha (Tiger dance) is a unique form of folk dance in Dakshina Kannada. Since tiger is considered as the favored carrier of Goddess Sharada (the deity in whose honor Dussera is celebrated), this dance is performed during the Dussera celebration.  It is also performed during other festivals like Krishna Janmasthami and Ganesh Chathurthi. Moodbidri is famous for Hulivesha performed on Ganesha Chathurthi just as Mangalore is famous for Dashera Hulivesha and Udupi for Janmashtami Hulivesha.one of the culture of magalore, performers are well trained and dedication is to high

Navaraatri 
During Navaraatri, the idol of Sharada Maathe is kept at Shri Lakshmi Venkateshwara Temple, Ponnechari, Moodabidri, by Saarvajanika Samithi and celebrated for two days very grandly. The Sharada Maathe idol is kept at the Venkataramana Temple Moodabidri and here it is celebrated for three days.

Maari Pooja or Rashi Pooja 
There are five Maari Gudi Temples in Moodbidri. Old Maari Gudi at Swaraj Maidan, Maari Gudi at Swaraj Maidan, Maari Gudi at Mahaveera College, Maari Gudi at Kotabagilu and maari Gudi at kallabettu.

Bhoota Kola
Bhoota Kola or spirit worship is practised here. Bhoota Kola is usually done at night. Most of the temples have Bhoota Kola on their annual festival.

Kambala 
Kambala or buffalo race is conducted in water-filled paddy fields.  The Rani Abbakka Kambala Stadium is constructed at Kadala Kere Nisarga Dhama.  Every year Kambla is organised here for two days.
Mijar  Jodu Kambla is another happening event, to see.

Korikatta
Korikatta (cockfight) is another favourite sport for village people on the annual festival of the temples.
To its supporters, cockfight, an ancient sport involving a fight between specially reared fowls held at the temples precincts in northern parts of Kasaragod, is not a blood sport but a feature of the rich cultural heritage of Tulunadu and an ancient ritual associated with the ‘daivasthanams’ (temples) here.

Nagaradhane
Nagaradhane or snake worship is practised according to the popular belief of the Naga Devatha to go underground and guard the species which lived on top.

Dindu / Karthik Poornima (Lakshadeepotsava)
Konkani-speaking GSBs have their own tradition of celebrating Lakshadeepotsava (Dindu) five-day festival starting from Uthana Dwadashi (Tulasi Pooja Day – the day on which four-month chaturmasa of Lord will end and Lord will come out of the temple for the first time in past four months. This day denotes start of Utsava (Pete Savari) of lord for the year). Out of five days last three days being Keredeepotsava (Chaturdashi) Lakshyadeepotsava (on full moon day of Kartika month in Kannada Kartika Hunnime or Karthik Poornima or Karthi-Punnav) and last day Okali (Holi) attract many people to the temple.

Muslims Eid-al-Fitr
Muslims Eid-al-Fitr (end of Ramadan)
Eid-al-Adha,
Day of Ashura / Muharram,
Milad un Nabi
Muslims celebrate Uroos in the Dargas every year.

Rathotsava
Jains have their Jain Milans yearly. All Jaina Basadi celebrated Ratotsava very grandly. Each goes for seven days.

Santhmari
It is the annual festival Celebrated by Christians at all the churches honouring and thanking the patrons of the particular church.

Nudisiri
Alvas Foundation used to organise annual literary and cultural meets called Alvas Nudisiri and Alvas Viarasat every year. In the year 2019 it was not conducted owing to floods at various places of Karnataka State.

Education
Alva's Education Foundation is also known to hold events which attracts participants from all-over Karnataka, it has held annual fest in the form of Alvas Virasath (College Fest) & Alvas Nudisiri (Event for enrichment of Kannada Language).

History
Moodabidri was ruled by the Jain Chowta dynasty 1603, who moved their capital to Moodabidri in 1603. They lost power when the region was taken over by Tipu Sultan They continued symbolic rituals after the British defeated Tipu Sultan. The last coronation at Moodabidri was done in 1865 according to a pattavali.

There are 18 lakes, 18 Jaina Basadis, 18 temples, and 18 roads connecting various villages in Moodbidri.

During 14th–16th centuries this town emerged as a center of Jain religion, culture, art and architecture. 18 Jain temples, known as Basadis, were constructed during this period. The Jain Math at Moodabidri is headed by a Bhattaraka belonging to the Mula Sangh order.

The most famous among them are Guru basadi, Tribhuvana Tilaka Chudamani Basadi (known as "Thousand Pillar Temple") and Ammanavara Basadi.

Guru basadi is the earliest of the Jain monuments. A stone idol of Parshwanatha, about 3.5 metres tall, is installed in the sanctum of this basadi. Here the rare Jain palm leaf manuscripts of 12th century A.D. known as ‘Dhavala texts’ are preserved.
Saavira Kambada Basadi basadi is the largest and the most ornate of the Jain temples of this region. People also call this temple Thousand Pillared Temple or Tribhuvana Tilaka Chudamani. This is a large granite temple built in 1430 A.D. The 2.5 metres tall bronze image of Lord Chandranatha Swami in the sanctum of this basadi is considered to be very sacred. This three-storey construction was supported by the rulers, the Jain Bhattaraka Swamiji, merchants and the common people. The temple has an open pillared hall in front, consisting of a large variety of ornate pillars decorated with carvings typical of Vijayanagara style. A 15-meter tall single stone pillar called manastambha stands in front of the basadi.
Ratnakara Varni, the medieval Kannada author of Bharatesha Vaibhava  belonged to this place. The Jain canonical texts known as Dhavala texts and also a number of palm leaf manuscripts of historical and literacy value are preserved in the Jain Math (monastery).

Moodabidri was the seat of the Chowtas, a Jain ruling family, who were originally located at Puthige, about 5 km from here. They moved their capital to Moodabidri in the 17th century. The remains of the 17th century Chowta Palace is known for its carved wooden pillars and ceilings.

Gowri Temple in the heart of the city is said to have been built in the seventh century.
Hanuman Temple in the heart of the city is the most famous temple around Moodbidri. People from many religions including Hindus, Muslims, and Christians offer prayers to the Lord Hanuman.

Sports
Yearly and monthly sports activities are held Swaraj Maidhan and SMC ground. State level and national sports meets are held here. Cricket, volleyball, badminton and different types of matches are played. Many flood light cricket and volleyball matches are held here. Alva's Education Foundation has hosted many state and national level sports meets here.

Industries
Small-scale industries employ many people. Many cashew industries are here. Kadale Kere is the industrial area where many small-scale industries are situated.

Transport facilities

Long distance travel and local transport

The local and long-distance transport includes the buses which ply regularly. Shuttle and express buses to Mangalore, Udupi, Karkala, Hebri, Shimoga, Kudremukh, Sringeri, Dharmastala, Bantwal, Belthangady, Naravi, Kinnigoli and Mulki run every five to ten minutes.

There are government buses to distant places like Bangalore, Mysore, Hubli, Dharwad, Subramanya, Chickmagalur and all the important places of Karnataka. Private buses from Moodabidri are also available to Bombay, Goa and Bangalore by established travels like Navami, Nishmitha, Sugama, Vishal, Ideal and Anand.

Entertainment
Other entertainment is watching Yakshagana, unique to this district. This includes a drama like play on epics, which lasts a whole night, starting at 9:30 pm and ending at 6 am next day. This is played normally once a week, and only in few months a year.

Some private Tulu drama companies play comedy drama at regular intervals between November and June.

Notable people
 

Srinivasa Gowda (born 1991), Kambala jockey

Climate

Photo gallery

See also 

 Belthangady
 Dharmasthala
 Kodangallu
 Siddakatte

References

External links 

 Alvasvishwanudisirivirasat -  2013
 Namma Bedra - Moodbidri News portal being published by Jaison Taccode
 Moodabidri Town Municipal Corporation

Jain temples in Karnataka
Cities and towns in Dakshina Kannada district